Queen's University of Belfast was a university constituency represented in the House of Commons of the United Kingdom Parliament from 1918 until 1950.

It returned one Member of Parliament (MP) elected by the first-past-the-post voting system.

Franchise
The MP was rather elected by the graduates of Queen's University Belfast.

First Dáil
After the 1918 election, Sinn Féin invited all those elected for constituencies in Ireland to sit as TDs in Dáil Éireann rather than in the House of Commons of the United Kingdom. All those elected for Irish constituencies were included in the roll of the Dáil but only those elected for Sinn Féin sat in the First Dáil. In May 1921, the Dáil passed a resolution declaring that elections to the House of Commons of Northern Ireland and the House of Commons of Southern Ireland would be used as the election for the Second Dáil and that the First Dáil would be dissolved on the assembly of the new body. The graduates of Queen's would then have represented in the Dáil by the four-seat constituency of Queen's University of Belfast, which also returned no representatives for Sinn Féin.

Members of Parliament

Politics and History of the constituency
University constituencies had existed in the United Kingdom Parliament and its predecessors since 1603 and in 1918 Queen's was enfranchised as such. When the Parliament of Northern Ireland was established, the same franchise was preserved - see Queen's University of Belfast (Northern Ireland Parliament constituency).

As with most other Northern Ireland seats in this period, the electorate was heavily inclined towards the Ulster Unionists, with no contests for the Westminster seat taking place at all in the interwar years.

Under the Representation of the People Act 1948, university constituencies at Westminster were abolished with effect at the 1950 United Kingdom general election.

Election results

Resignation of Sinclair

References 

Historic Westminster constituencies in Belfast
Queen's University Belfast
University constituencies of the Parliament of the United Kingdom
Dáil constituencies in Northern Ireland (historic)
Constituencies of the Parliament of the United Kingdom established in 1918
Constituencies of the Parliament of the United Kingdom disestablished in 1950